Abrostola bettoni is a moth of the family Noctuidae. It is found in Kenya.

References

Plusiinae
Moths of Africa
Moths described in 1958